The Italian three-toed skink or the cylindrical skink (Chalcides chalcides) is a species of lizard found from Italy (including Sicily, Sardinia and Elba), to northern Algeria, Libya, Morocco and Tunisia. Its body is long and snake-like, coloured usually between brown and olive and may have dark stripes on the back. Each of the highly reduced legs has three fingers. These skinks are active during daytime and prey mainly on insects. Females of the species give birth to live young. The population of this skink is slowly declining, but it has some tolerance to habitat modification.

Description
This skink superficially looks like a snake except for the possession of tiny limbs with three-toed feet, the middle toe of the hind foot being longer than the other two, a fact that differentiates it from the Western three-toed skink (Chalcides striatus). There are three different colour variants; Some animals are plain silvery-grey; some have four to six narrow lengthwise lines running along the body; some have these lines but additionally a pale longitudinal, lateral band.

Distribution and habitat
The Italian three-toed skink is native to Italy, where it is common south of the River Po, and including Sardinia, Elba and Sicily, and North Africa, where its range includes Morocco, Algeria, Tunisia and Libya. Its typical habitat is damp but sunny areas with dense low vegetation such as meadows, stream verges, marshes, grassy slopes and hedgerows. In upland areas it may inhabit drier, more arid areas with low scrub and degraded slopes.

Status
The Italian three-toed skink is common in suitable habitats over much of its wide range. It is threatened by urbanization and the degradation of its habitat by coastal development, but it is tolerant of some degree of habitat modification. The IUCN has listed it as being of "Least Concern" because, although the population is probably declining, this is not at a fast enough rate to warrant listing it in a more threatened category.

References 

Chalcides
Reptiles described in 1758
Taxa named by Carl Linnaeus